Symbol of Life is the ninth studio album by British metal band Paradise Lost. It marks a departure by the band from their synth-based approach and returning to a much heavier sound, although not abandoning the keyboards altogether. This album was the final release featuring drummer Lee Morris.

Two songs which were written and left out for this album are "I Can Hate You" and "Deus". Neither have been released on any of the reissues of this album, but can be found on the digipak version of the single "Erased"; the aforementioned single has a music video. "Isolate" was also released as a single.

Track listing 

Limited edition

Personnel 
Nick Holmes – vocals
Gregor Mackintosh – lead guitar, keyboards
Aaron Aedy – rhythm guitar
Steve Edmondson – bass guitar
Lee Morris – drums, backing vocals

Credits 
Composed by: Gregor Mackintosh
Lyrics by: Nick Holmes
Producer: Rhys Fulber
Published by: Zomba Music Publishers Ltd.
Keyboards and programming by: Gregor Mackintosh and Rhys Fulber
Recorded and mixed by: Greg Reely
Additional keyboards by: Jamie Muhoberac (tracks 1, 2, 4, 11)
Strings arrangements and Piano: Chris Elliott (tracks 8, 10)
Additional vocals: Lee Dorian (track 2) courtesy of Dreamcatcher Records, Joanna Stevens (tracks 2, 5, 7) and Devin Townsend (tracks 3, 13) courtesy of Century Media Records
Assistant engineers: Ewan Davies and Will Bartle (Chapel Studios) and Bart (Dreamcatcher Studios)
Recorded at: Chapel Studios, Lincolnshire, during June–July 2002 and Dreamcatcher Recording Studios, Bradford, 2002
Additional recording by: Carmen Rizzo at Studio 775, Los Angeles, California, US
Mixed at: The Green Jacket, Richmond, Canada
Additional digital editing by: Chris Potter
Mastered by: Kai Blankenberg at Skyline Studios, Düsseldorf, Germany
Artwork by: [sleeve design] – Dirk Rudolph
Photography [band, screens]: Olaf Heine
Photography [front]: Nick Veasey

Charts

References 

Paradise Lost (band) albums
2002 albums
GUN Records albums
Industrial metal albums
Albums produced by Rhys Fulber